July Rain is a 1967 Soviet drama film directed by Marlen Khutsiev.

Plot
The heroes of the film are about thirty. Very often at this time people have a period of revision of the positions already developed earlier. Lena, the heroine of this film, comes to such revision. She has a lot to think about again.

She begins to understand that the previous assessment of the surface, all appears to her in a different, more clear and sharp light. It is sometimes associated with loss. Lena loses her former closest person who becomes a stranger and distant.

Cast 
 Yevgenia Uralova as Lena
 Aleksandr Belyavsky as Volodya
 Yuri Vizbor as Alik
 Yevgenia Kozyreva as Lena's Mother
 Alexander Mitta as Vladik
 Alla Pokrovskaya as Lelya Kurikhina
 Valentina Sharykina as Lyusya
 Ilya Bylinkin as Zhenya (as I. Bylinkin)
 Yuri Ilchuk as Leva

Reaction 

Marlen Khutsiev's film was released at the very end of the ottepel, at about the same time the films of Andrey Konchalovsky, Andrey Tarkovsky, Kira Muratova, Alexander Alov and Vladimir Naumov were put on the shelf.

References

External links 

1967 drama films
1967 films
Soviet drama films
Films directed by Marlen Khutsiev
Mosfilm films
Soviet black-and-white films